Kanjanur is a village in the Thiruvidaimarudur taluk of Thanjavur district, Tamil Nadu, India. It is one of the nine Navagrahasthalas of the Cauvery Delta and is famous for its Agniswarar temple dedicated to Shukra (Venus). The temple is one of the "Navagraha temples" of the Cauvery Delta. Magnesite deposits have discovered in these hills.

References 
 
 

Villages in Thanjavur district